Florence White may refer to:

 Florence White (painter) (1860s–1932), British portrait and miniature painter
 Florence White (writer) (1863–1940), British food writer
 Florence White (campaigner) (1886–1961), British pensions campaigner